The 1924 United Kingdom general election in Northern Ireland was held on 29 October as part of the wider general election in the United Kingdom. There were ten constituencies, seven single-seat constituencies with elected by FPTP and three two-seat constituencies with MPs elected by bloc voting.

Results
The Nationalist Party did not contest this election. The nationalist interest was represented in the election by Sinn Féin, but they failed to win any seats, and the two seats which had been held by the Nationalist Party were won by the Ulster Unionists, so that all MPs in the region were from the same party.

In the election as a whole, the Conservative Party, which included the Ulster Unionists, returned to government with 412 of the 615 seats, and Stanley Baldwin was re-appointed as Prime Minister.

MPs elected

By-election

Footnotes

References

Northern Ireland
1924
1924 elections in Northern Ireland